Cumminsville is a hamlet and census-designated place in the town of North Dansville, Livingston County, New York, United States. Its population was 183 as of the 2010 census. It is on the northwest edge of the village of Dansville, and Interstate 390 and New York State Route 36 pass through the community.

Geography

Demographics

References

Hamlets in Livingston County, New York
Hamlets in New York (state)
Census-designated places in Livingston County, New York
Census-designated places in New York (state)